Vanji Kottai Valipan is a 1958 Indian Tamil-language Ruritanian romance film written by the Gemini Studios story department, consisting of K. J. Mahadevan, C. Srinivasan and Kothamangalam Subbu, while the film was directed and produced by S. S. Vasan. It stars Gemini Ganesan and Vyjayanthimala and Padmini, with P. S. Veerappa, T. K. Shanmugam, P. Kannamba, Vijayakumari, K. A. Thangavelu and M. S. Sundari Bai in supporting roles. The camera was handled by P. Ellappa and the audiography was handled by C. E. Biggs, while the editing was done by N. R. Krishna Sami. This film was remade in Hindi as Raj Tilak with the same lead actors.

Plot 
Chokkalingam Navalar is a diwan at Vanjikottai Kingdom. He with his wife, Sivakami, is loyal to their King. Chokkalingam without any hesitation accuses that Senapathi, the brother of the King's second wife, Rani plotted the prince's killing. Found guilty, Senapathi is banished by the King but is helped by one of his soldiers to stay in the kingdom without anyone's knowledge. He later sets up a fire in the city and stabs the king with his sword. The king, before dying tells Chokkalingam to save his daughter Padma and the infant prince, and dies later. In order to fulfill the king's desire, Chokkalingam sails to safety with the king's children, leaving his family behind. Soon his wife does the same with her children, but is caught by Senapathi's army. Leaving her children on the moving boat, she is imprisoned for life at an island prison.

After, 10 years, the grown up Sunder plans to arrange his sister's wedding, but it is interrupted by Senapathi, who kidnaps Gowri (Vijayakumari) in Sunder's absence. While returning home for the preparation for the engagement, Sunder spots Gowri with Senapathi in his vehicle. In order to escape from Senapathi, Gowri jumps out of the vehicle and dies soon. Sunder, who seeks justice from Senapathi, plans to kill him, only to be captured by his army. After he is found guilty for his action, Sunder is later imprisoned for life in an island jail. There, he gets the chance to meet his mother. She explains to him about Senapathi's persecution of their family and the Vanjikottai kingdom. They both plan to escape from the prison. However, his mother dies in the attempt. Sunder jumps into the sea and escapes. He was saved by a ship carrying slaves to Ratna Island.

Landed as a slave in Ratna island, Sunder meets Princess Mandakini (Vyjayanthimala). The princess at first is averse to the attitude of Sunder, who ignores her beauty and does not respond to her assertive and arrogant behaviour. Later she falls for him and gives him special treatment. Though Sunder also likes her, he requests Mandakini to release him in order to find his father and solve the conspiracy in his kingdom. She agrees with all the requests on the condition that he would return within one month. Mandakini provides Sunder with expensive jewelry, clothes and a boat, and sends Sunder to his kingdom. Meanwhile, Chokkalingam, who is living in one of the hinterland villages with Padma the princess and the young prince, is planning a revolution along with Murugan, who serves as his spy at Vanjikottai. After awareness of the revolution is disseminated to the masses in Vanjikottai, Chokkalingam returns to Vanjikkottai to bring down Senapathi's government. He is later joined by Sunder, Padma, Murugan, Rangamma, Velan and his wife. Sunder acts as a jeweler and deceives Maharani Ranthamani Devi and Senapathi by gaining their trust. He later invites them to his palace to watch a dance by Padma. He also plans to release Chokkalingam, Murugan and his wife Rangamma who were arrested by Senapathi during the revolution.

After one month, Mandakini comes to Vanjikottai to search for Sunder. She set up her camp at the border of Vanjikottai and sends her spy to locate Sunder's place. While spotting Sunder and Padma together, her spy mistakes that Sunder is in love with Padma. Mandakini who hears the news approaches Sunder. Unable to explain his situation, Sunder asks Mandakini to watch the show along with Maharani Ranthamani Devi and Senapathi. Padma overhears their conversation and realizes Sunder's love towards Mandakini and changes her mind by forgetting her love. In the court, while watching the dance performed by Padma, Mandakini is angered by the meaning of Padma's song which indirectly tells her feelings towards Sunder. Soon, Mandakini changes her costume and gives stiff competition in dance to Padma. When Padma almost faints during the rotation, Sunder cuts the chandelier's rope making the chandelier to crash, thus ending the dance competition. Then he orders Velan to drag Mandakini out and tie her into a room. After Senapathi has become intoxicated, Sunder uses this situation to masquerade as Senapathi and rescues Murugan and Rangamma from the prison. He also gets to know that Chokkalingam has been brought to the island prison to undergo the death penalty.

Meanwhile, Mandakini who escapes from Velan, joins Senapathi and divulges details of the secret place where Chokkalingam, Sunder, Padma and others are hiding. In return, she asks him to send Sunder to her in order to live with him. Senapathi arrests all of them including Sunder. Mandakini realizes that Senapathi has tricked her, and gathers her army to save Sunder and the others. Murugan and the people of Vanjikottai head to Senapathi's palace to bring down his government. Knowing this, Senapathi leaves the palace for the immediate execution of Sunder's and others death penalty. Murugan gets to know the place where the execution is to occur and he brings his people to kill Senapathi. Mandakini who also arrives there with her army joins the battle to bring down Senapathi. During the battle, Senapathi throws his sword at Sunder, but it hits Mandakini when she tries to protect him. The battle ended with the killing of Senapathi. Mandakini died while uniting Padma with Sunder.

Cast 
Cast according to the opening credits of the film

 Gemini Ganesan as Sunderalingam
 Vyjayanthimala as Mandakini
 Padmini as Padma
 T. K. Shanmugam as Chokkalinga Navalar
 Kannamba as Navalar's Wife
 S. V. Subbaiah as Murugan
 M. S. Sundari Bai as Ragamma
 Veerappa as Senapathi

 T. K. Ramachandran as Kothaval
 Vijayakumari as Gowri
 Meenakshi as Princess
 Daisy Irani as Prince
 R. Balasubramaniam as King of Rathna Island
 D. Balasubramaniam as King
 Thangavelu as Velan
 Muthulakshmi as Velan's Wife

Production 
According to Ramanathan, owner of Abirami Malls, Chennai, his father V. S. Sivalingam bought the distribution rights for Vanji Kottai Valipan at a cost of  200,000 in 1956. The film suffered from too much of "process screen" or Back projection where many shots from Gemini Studios's magnum opus Chandralekha were used. A case in point is the scene where actor Ranjan and his gang are riding on horses that was taken from Chandralekha. Besides, a passing by of a motor car was seen in a shot which was an anachronism in this pre-industrial era story.

Soundtrack 
The film's soundtrack was composed by C. Ramachandra, and R.Vaidyanathan while the lyrics were penned by Kothamangalam Subbu. The playback singers are P. Leela, Jikki, C. S. Jayaraman, P. Susheela Thiruchi Loganathan, T. V. Rathnam and Sirkazhi Govindarajan.

Reception 

The film initially gained a big opening at the box office as it was the first film produced by S. S. Vasan after a 10-year gap since Chandralekha. The audience was pleased by the dances featuring the lead actresses; Vyjayanthimala and Padmini and the production value of the film. At the end of its theatrical run the film was labelled as a blockbuster at the box office. The film celebrated its 100th day theatrical run at Wellington theatre, LIC Building on 9 June 1959 with a full-packed house. The film was one of the successful Tamil films of 1958 along with films such as Nadodi Mannan and Uthama Puthiran. This film was the second biggest hit of the year 1958 after the mega hit  Nadodi Mannan.

Inspirations and remakes 
The film was inspired by the 1844 novel The Count of Monte Cristo. The film was shot simultaneously in Hindi as Raj Tilak with Gemini Ganesan, Vyjayanthimala and Padmini, who reprises their role from original. It was also dubbed in Telugu as Vijaya Kota Veerudu.

Legacy 
The film was well known for its technical brilliance where the title sequence showing a ship caught in a storm was an excellent example of onscreen presentation which was rarely seen in South Indian film of that time. However, it was the dance sequence of Vyjayanthimala and Padmini in the song "Kannum Kannum Kalanthu", which was choreographed by Hiralal, brother of B. Sohanlal, that is still remembered even today by the critics and audience alike, where the popularity of the song surpasses the popularity garnered by the film. The song was regarded as the best dance sequence in Indian cinema. The song was also used by many Indian classical dancers for stage performances. Subsequently, the catch line used by Veerappa, "Shabhash, sariyana potti!", which means "Bravo, an excellent competition!" has become a famous catch line and is still used by the people of Tamil Nadu.

References

External links 
 

1950s Tamil-language films
1958 films
1980s historical adventure films
Films about revolutions
Films about royalty
Films based on The Count of Monte Cristo
Films directed by S. S. Vasan
Films scored by C. Ramchandra
Films set in the 18th century
Films with screenplays by Kothamangalam Subbu
Gemini Studios films
History of India on film
Indian black-and-white films
Indian epic films
Indian historical adventure films
Indian historical romance films